

This is a list of the Pennsylvania state historical markers in Sullivan County.

This is intended to be a complete list of the official state historical markers placed in Sullivan County, Pennsylvania by the Pennsylvania Historical and Museum Commission (PHMC). The locations of the historical markers, as well as the latitude and longitude coordinates as provided by the PHMC's database, are included below when available. There are seven historical markers located in Sullivan County.

Historical markers

See also

List of Pennsylvania state historical markers
National Register of Historic Places listings in Sullivan County, Pennsylvania

References

External links
Pennsylvania Historical Marker Program
Pennsylvania Historical & Museum Commission

Pennsylvania state historical markers in Sullivan County
Sullivan County
Tourist attractions in Sullivan County, Pennsylvania